This is a list of presidents of the Geologists' Association.

1858–59 Smith, Toulmin
1859–62 WILTSHIRE, The Revd. Thomas DSc FLS FGS
1862–64 Tennant, Professor James FGS FRGS
1864–66 CRESY, Edward
1866–68 RICHARDSON, Christopher Thomas MD
1868–71 Morris, Professor John MA FGS
1871–73 WILTSHIRE, The Revd. Thomas DSc FLS FGS
1873–75 Woodward, Henry LLD FRS FGS FZS
1875–77 Carruthers, William FRS FLS FGS
1877–79 Morris, Professor John MA FGS
1879–81 Jones, Professor T. Rupert FRS FGS
1881–83 Hudleston, W. H. MA FRS FGS FCS
1883–85 Hicks, Henry MD FRS FGS
1885–87 Topley, W. FRS FGS AssocInstCE
1887–89 Rudler, F. W. ISO FGS
1889–91 HOLMES, Thomas Vincent FGS
1891–93 Blake, The Revd. Professor J. F. MA FGS	
1893–94 Woodward, Horace B. FRS FGS
1894–96 McMahon, Lt-General C. A. FRS FGS
1896–98 Newton, E. T. FRS FGS FZS
1898–00 Teall, Sir J. J. H. MA FRS FGS				
1900–02 Whitaker, W. BA FRS FGS
1902–04 MONCKTON, Horace Woollaston FLS FGS
1904–06 Smith Woodward, Sir Arthur. LLD FRS FLS FGS
1906–08 HERRIES, Robert Stanfield MA FGS
1908–10 Watts, Professor W. W. LLD DSc MSc FRS FGS
1910–12 HILL, William FGS
1912–14 Evans, John W. CBE LLB DSc FRS FGS
1914–16 YOUNG, George W. FGS FZS
1916–18 Barrow, George FGS
1918–20 Green, J. F. N. BA FGS
1920–1-22 Whitaker, W. BA FRS FGS
1922–24 HAZZLEDINE WARREN, Samuel FGS
1924–26 DEWEY, Henry FGS
1926–28 BULL, Alfred Joseph MSc FGS
1928–30 Morley Davies, Arthur DSc ARCS FGS
1930–32 Watts, Professor W. W. LLD DSc MSc FRS FGS
1932–34 LEACH, Arthur Leonard FGS
1934–36 Kitson, Sir Albert E. CMG CBE FGS
1936–38 McINTYRE, Peter FGS
1938–40 Hawkins, Professor H. L. DSc FRS FGS
1940–42 STEBBING, William Pinkard D. FSA FGS LRIBA
1942–44 Read, Professor H. H. DSc ARCS FRS FGS
1944–46 KENNARD, Alfred Santer ALS FGS
1946–48 BROMEHEAD, Cyril Edward Nowill BA FGS
1948–50 BROWN, Edmund Ernest Stockwell MBE FGS
1950–52 EASTWOOD, Tom ARCS MIMM FGS
1952–54 HIMUS, Godfrey Wilfred PhD FGS
1954–56 Cox, L. R. OBE MA DSc RS FGS
1956–58 WRIGHT, Claud William MA FilDr CB FGS
1958–60 WILLIAMS, Professor David DSc PhD MIMM FGS
1960–62 PITT, Leslie John FGS	
1962–64 KIRKALDY, Professor John Francis DSc FGS
1964–66 Curry, Dennis MA FGS
1966–68 Sutton, Professor J. DSc FRS FGS
1968–70 MONTFORD, Horace Moutrie OBE BSc FGS
1970–72 HOLMES, Stanley Charles Arthur MA FGS
1972–74 ARBER, Muriel Agnes MA FGS FRGS
1974–76 AGER, Professor Derek Victor DSc PhD DIC FGS
1976–78 MOORE, Francis Harry BSc PhD FGS
1978–80 BISHOP, Arthur Clive BSc PhD FGS
1980–82 SMITH, Alec James BSc PhD FGS
1982–84 KNILL, Professor John Lawrence DSc FICE FIGeol FGS
1984–86 KING, Anthony John Paynter FCII FGS
1986–88 HANCOCK, Professor John Michael MA PhD FGS			
1988–90 EVANS, John Michael BA
1990–91 Halstead, Lambert Beverly PhD DSc FGS
1991–94 ROBINSON, John Eric BSc PhD
1994–96 GREEN, Christopher Paul BA DPhil FGS
1996–98 SYMES, Robert Frederick OBE BSc PhD
1998–2000 MOODY, Professor Richard Thomas Jones PhD FGS
2000–02 BROWN, Susan BSc MSc DIC FGS M.Inst.Env.Sc
2002–04 FRENCH, William John BSc PhD FGS
2004–06 COCKS, Professor, Leonard Robert Morrison OBE TD MA D.Phil. DSc CGeol FGS
2006–08 Benton, Michael James BSc PhD. FGS
2008–10 SCHREVE, Danielle C. BSc, PhD
2010–12 BRIDGLAND, D.R. BSc, PhD
2012–14 MORTIMORE, R.N. Professor BSc.PhD.MIGeol,C.Eng.C.Geol. FGS	
2014–16 BAILEY, H.W., BSc. PhD. C.Geol. FGS 		
2016–18 PROSSER, Colin D. BSc. PhD. FGS	
2018–20 PIERPOINT, Nicholas 
2020-22 BANKS,Vanessa BSc. PhD.

See also 
 List of geologists

References

External links 
 

British geologists
Presidents of the Geologists' Association